KCHK may refer to:

 KCHK (AM), a radio station (1350 AM) licensed to serve New Prague, Minnesota, United States
 KCHK-FM, a radio station (95.5 FM) licensed to serve New Prague, Minnesota